Brett Le Man (born 15 April 1962) is an Australian former professional rugby league footballer who played in the 1980s and 1990s.

Background
While attending Cooparoo High School, Le Man played for the Australian Schoolboys team in 1979.

Playing career
The curly-haired back-rower played in the Brisbane Rugby League (BRL) for the Easts Tigers and Brisbane Brothers, winning a first-grade premiership with both clubs (Easts in 1983, and Brothers in 1987). Le Man went on to play for the Brisbane Broncos between their foundation year of 1988 and 1991, appearing in 38 games and scoring nine tries. In 1988, he famously scored the Broncos' first-ever try in a premiership match, during their inaugural game against Manly in round one at Lang Park, after gathering possession of the ball following a Craig Grauf bomb.

Post playing
Le Man now owns his own company and has two children.

References

1962 births
Living people
Australian rugby league players
Brisbane Broncos players
Eastern Suburbs Tigers players
Past Brothers players
Rugby league players from Brisbane
Rugby league second-rows